Louis Van Schil (18 November 1921 – 6 October 2006) was a Belgian cyclist. He competed in the tandem event at the 1948 Summer Olympics.

References

External links
 

1921 births
2006 deaths
Belgian male cyclists
Olympic cyclists of Belgium
Cyclists at the 1948 Summer Olympics
Cyclists from Antwerp